The Saskatchewan Transportation Company (STC) was a Crown corporation in the Canadian province of Saskatchewan responsible for operating intercity bus routes in the province from 1946 to 2017. Created in 1946 by an Order in Council giving the company a mandate to provide service between major urban centres and to as much of the rural population as possible, STC was a wholly owned subsidiary of the Crown Investments Corporation of Saskatchewan.

The government of Saskatchewan announced on March 22, 2017 that it planned to shut down STC by the end of May 2017. Freight services were terminated effective May 19, and passenger services were terminated effective May 31.

Facilities
STC owned and operated bus depots in Regina, Saskatoon, and Prince Albert. It also had numerous ticket agencies in communities throughout the province and served as an agent for Greyhound tickets at many of its locations.

Regina Terminal
Address: 1717 Saskatchewan Drive, Regina
Coordinates: 
Facility includes: Head office, STC bus station, STC freight terminal, Greyhound Canada service, Robin's Donuts
Opened: October 8, 2008

Saskatoon Terminal

Address: 50 – 23rd Street East, Saskatoon
Coordinates: 
Facility includes: STC bus station, STC freight terminal, Greyhound Canada service, Robin's Donuts

Prince Albert Terminal
Address: 99 – 15th Street East, Prince Albert
Coordinates: 
Facility includes: STC bus station, STC freight terminal, Greyhound Canada service

Agencies
The Saskatchewan Transportation Company worked with over 170 private companies within the province to provide local passenger and express depots to rural communities. These locations were referred to as agencies and made up the ground work by which STC was able to provide service to the people of Saskatchewan.

Services

Maintenance
The Saskatchewan Transportation Company operated Maintenance Facilities in Regina and Saskatoon, which allowed for the efficient operation of their fleet and provided an array of services to foreign fleet customers.

Saskatoon Bus Service Centre
Address: 88 King Street, Saskatoon
Coordinates:

Regina Bus Maintenance Centre
Address: 9th Avenue and Wallace Street, Regina
Coordinates:

Passenger
STC operated a number of routes to both urban and rural communities across Saskatchewan.  Many STC passenger coaches were wheelchair accessible and all were Wi-Fi equipped.

Express
STC had a history of package delivery across Saskatchewan. Many people relied on STC to transport packages, parcels, and equipment to rural areas. While providing overnight service to many locations, STC also provided customers with door-to-door pick-up and delivery in major centres.

Charter
STC provided charter services to a number of groups and organizations every year in Saskatchewan. Many corporations, sports teams, and clubs chose STC when travelling to functions both in and out of province. Charters were available any day of the week and for various lengths of time subject to availability.

Employees
STC employed over 230 people. All In Scope employees were members of the Amalgamated Transit Union.

Closure and sale of assets
The provincial government shut down STC in 2017 as part of spending cutbacks. Ridership had decreased 77 percent since its peak in 1980, and only two of its 27 routes turned a profit. The opposition NDP criticized the shutdown, saying it would hurt rural residents who relied upon the service for parcel delivery and transportation for medical appointments in larger centres.

The company's assets were sold for $29 million, slightly more than their appraised value of $25.7 million (CAD).

References

External links

 

1946 establishments in Saskatchewan
2017 disestablishments in Saskatchewan
Bus transport in Saskatchewan
Crown corporations of Saskatchewan
Defunct intercity bus companies of Canada
Defunct transport companies of Canada
Organizations based in Regina, Saskatchewan
Organizations disestablished in 2017
Organizations established in 1946
Canadian companies established in 1946